Oleksandr Mykolayovych Sharkovsky (also Sharkovskii, Sharkovskiy, Sharkovs’kyi sometimes used the Šarkovskii or Sarkovskii) (7 December 1936 – 21 November 2022) was a Ukrainian mathematician most famous for developing Sharkovsky's theorem on the periods of discrete dynamical systems in 1964.

He was a corresponding member of the Academy of Sciences of the Ukrainian SSR (1978), and academician of the National Academy of Sciences of Ukraine (2006). Prize laureate of the National Academy of Sciences of Ukraine named after M. M. Bogolyubov and M. O. Lavretiev.

Life and career
In 1952, Sharkovsky's name appeared in the mathematical world - the magazine "Russian Mathematical Surveys", when eighth-grader Oleksandr Sharkovsky became the winner of the Kyiv Mathematical Olympiad for schoolchildren. And he wrote his first scientific work already in his first year of Kyiv National University. After graduating with honors from Taras Shevchenko National University of Kyiv he also successfully completed postgraduate studies at the NASU Institute of Mathematics with an early defense of his candidate's thesis (1961). And soon, in 1967, he defended his doctoral thesis. In 1978, O. M. Sharkovsky was elected a corresponding member of the Academy of Sciences of the Ukrainian SSR. Since 1974, O. M. Sharkovsky headed the department of differential equations of the Institute of Mathematics of the Ukrainian SSR Academy of Sciences, and since 1986 he headed the department of the theory of dynamical systems, which was created on his initiative. 

In 2006, Sharkovsky became a full member of the National Academy of Sciences of Ukraine. He is the head of the department of the Theory of dynamical systems at the Institute of Mathematics of the National Academy of Sciences of Ukraine. In the last years of his life, he worked as a chief researcher of the Department of Theory of Dynamic Systems and Fractal Analysis of the Institute of Mathematics of the National Academy of Sciences.

O.M. Sharkovsky died on 21 November 2022, at the age of 85.

Scientific work 
Oleksandr Sharkovsky created the foundations of the topological theory of one-dimensional dynamic systems, a theory that today is one of the tools for researching evolutionary problems of the most diverse nature. He discovered the law of coexistence of periodic trajectories of different periods; the topological structure of basins of attraction of various sets is investigated; a number of criteria of simplicity and complexity of dynamic systems were obtained. O. M. Sharkovsky also contributed fundamental results in dynamical systems theory on arbitrary topological spaces.

The achievements of the Ukrainian scientist received general recognition in international scientific circles. The formation and development of chaotic dynamics are associated with his name. In the scientific literature, you can find such terms as Sharkovsky's theorem, Sharkovsky's ordering, Sharkovsky's space, Sharkovsky's stratification, etc. 

Sharkovsky's theorem is associated with initiating a new direction in the theory of dynamical systems — combinatorial dynamics. In 1994, an international conference "Thirty years of Sharkovsky's theorem" was held in Spain. New perspectives".

Research conducted by O. M. Sharkovsky allowed him to propose the concept of "ideal turbulence" — a new mathematical phenomenon in deterministic systems that models the most complex properties of turbulence in time and space, namely: the processes of the formation of coherent structures of decreasing scales and the birth of random states.

O. M. Sharkovsky actively combines scientific work with pedagogical activity. From the mid-60s of the 20th century. gave general courses and lectures on the theory of dynamic systems at the mechanical and mathematical faculty of his native university. O. M. Sharkovsky is the author of almost 250 scientific works, including five monographs written in co-authorship with students. Among the students are 3 doctors and 14 candidates of sciences. 

The Ukrainian scientist devoted a lot of energy and time to developing scientific relations. He gave lectures at universities and scientific centers in more than 20 countries in Europe and America, and at universities in China and Australia. He was a member of the editorial boards of a number of international mathematical publications, in particular, he was a co-editor of the journal "Journal of Difference Equations and Applications" (USA).

His last paper "Descriptive theory of determined chaos" was published in the Ukrains’kyi Matematychnyi Zhurnal (Ukrainian Mathematical Journal) in January 2023.

References

External links
 Sharkovsky Oleksandr Mykolayovych memorial page at the Institute of Mathematics NAS of Ukraine
 
 Oleksandr Mikolaiovich Sharkovsky at the MacTutor History of Mathematics archive

1936 births
2022 deaths
Scientists from Kyiv
Ukrainian mathematicians
Full Members of the National Academy of Sciences of Ukraine
Taras Shevchenko National University of Kyiv alumni
Academic staff of the Taras Shevchenko National University of Kyiv